Emblemariopsis signifer is a species of chaenopsid blenny found in coral reefs in the western Atlantic ocean. It can reach a maximum length of  SL. This species is preyed on by Horse-eye jacks.

References
 Ginsburg, I.   1942 (15 Dec.) Seven new American fishes. Journal of the Washington Academy of Sciences v. 32 (no. 12): 364–370.

signifer
Fish described in 1942
Fish of the Atlantic Ocean
Taxa named by Isaac Ginsburg